Anton Kustinskiy (born 4 April 1995) is a Belarusian former professional footballer.

External links 
 
 
 Profile at Dinamo Brest website

1995 births
Living people
Belarusian footballers
FC Dynamo Brest players
Association football defenders